Théo Mey (1912–1964) was a Luxembourg photographer who worked as a photojournalist for various national and foreign newspapers and magazines. He also participated in motorsports, handball and athletics. His collection of some 400,000 images is archived in Luxembourg City's Photothèque. A selection of these is to be found in "Théo Mey: Trésors de la Photothèque" published in 2002.

References

Luxembourgian photographers
1912 births
1964 deaths
Photojournalists